Robertsfors is a locality and the seat of Robertsfors Municipality in Västerbotten County, Sweden with 2,004 inhabitants in 2010.

Robertsfors is named after the Scotsman Robert Finlay, who, together with  John Jennings, founded an ironworks there in 1751.

Well known people from Robertsfors 
Maria Andersson, musician, member of Sahara Hotnights
Josephine Forsman, musician, member of Sahara Hotnights and Casablanca
Jennie Asplund, musician, member of Sahara Hotnights
Johanna Asplund, musician, member of Sahara Hotnights
Frida Hyvönen, musician
Jennifer Granholm, second-generation descendant of Swedish Canadian emigrants from Robertsfors, where her great-grandfather was mayor

References 

Populated places in Västerbotten County
Populated places in Robertsfors Municipality
Municipal seats of Västerbotten County
Swedish municipal seats